Phu Dorjee (also spelled Phu Dorji) was a Sherpa and the first Indian to summit Mount Everest without supplemental oxygen. He did so on May 5, 1984 on a solo ascent from the South East Ridge. Dorjee died in 1987 on the Kanchanjunga Expedition of the Assam Rifles.

Another Phu Dorjee had summited Everest in the 1965 Indian Everest Expedition 1965; he died in a fall on Everest on 18 October 1969.

References

See also
Indian summiters of Mount Everest - Year wise
List of Mount Everest records of India
List of Mount Everest records
List of Mount Everest summiters by number of times to the summit
List of 20th-century summiters of Mount Everest

1987 deaths
Indian mountain climbers
Year of birth missing
Mountaineering deaths
Recipients of the Padma Shri in sports
Indian summiters of Mount Everest
Sherpa summiters of Mount Everest
Mountain climbers from Sikkim
Recipients of the Arjuna Award